Floyd A. Esquibel (born August 27, 1938) is an American politician. He is a former Democratic member of the Wyoming Senate, representing the 8th district.

Biography
Esquibel was born in Mora, New Mexico and attended St Mary's High School. He earned a BS from the University of Wyoming in 1966, and a MSW from the University of Denver in 1972. In 1975 he earned a JD from the University of Denver.  He was Supervisor in Social Work from 1989 to 1996, and from 1989 to 1992 he served as Compliance Officer for the State of Wyoming. Esquibel was Supervisor for the State of Nebraska in 1989, and Hearing Officer for the State of Wyoming from 1982 to 1986.

Esquibel was elected to the Wyoming House of Representatives, serving from 1997 through 2009. He served in the Wyoming Senate from 2009 until 2017, and was the Wyoming Senate Minority Caucus Chairman from 2011 to 2012.

Esquibel and his wife Jacqueline have three children, Stephanie Esquibel, Martin Esquibel and Jacqueline Esquibel. They have three grandchildren and reside in Cheyenne, Wyoming. Esquibel is the brother of Ken Esquibel, also a former state legislator in Wyoming. He is Hispanic.

References

External links
Wyoming State Legislature - Senator Floyd Esquibel official WY Senate website
Floyd Esquibel for Wyoming official campaign website
 
Follow the Money - Floyd Esquibel
2008 Senate campaign contributions
2006 2004 2002 2000 1998 1996 House campaign contributions

Democratic Party Wyoming state senators
Democratic Party members of the Wyoming House of Representatives
1938 births
Living people
People from Mora, New Mexico
Politicians from Cheyenne, Wyoming
University of Wyoming alumni
University of Denver alumni
Hispanic and Latino American state legislators
21st-century American politicians
20th-century American politicians